Superstar is a 2008 Sri Lankan Sinhala action romantic comedy film produced by AJ Films. It stars Sanath Gunathilake and Kanchana Mendis in lead roles along with Rex Kodippili and Cletus Mendis. Music composed by Jayantha Ratnayake. It is the 1100th Sri Lankan film in the Sinhala cinema.

Cast
 Sanath Gunathilake as Ranjith Bandara
 Kanchana Mendis
 Rex Kodippili as Jayawardana
 Cletus Mendis
 G.R Perera
 Ananda Athukorala
 Manjula Thilini

References

External links
 

2008 films
2000s Sinhala-language films